Subhercostomus is a subgenus of Neohercostomus, a genus of flies in the family Dolichopodidae. The type species, N. turneri, was formerly from "Hercostomus Group III", one of three groups of Afrotropical Hercostomus species created by Igor Grichanov in 1999.

Species
N. manningi Grichanov, 2011
N. silvicola Grichanov, 2011
N. turneri (Grichanov, 1999)

References

Insect subgenera
Dolichopodinae
Diptera of Africa